The District of Porto is located on the north-west coast of Portugal. The district capital is the city of Porto, the second largest city in the country. It is bordered by the Aveiro and Viseu districts to the south, Braga district to the north and Vila Real district to the east.

In 2017, the main legal foreign populations were from Brazil (9,442), China (2,475), Ukraine (2,160), Italy (1,273), Spain (1,189), Angola (1,118), and Cape Verde (1,040). These numbers exclude those who obtained Portuguese citizenship, which is regular among recent Portuguese Brazilians or Portuguese-Africans.

Municipalities
The district comprises 18 municipalities:

 Amarante  [city]
 Baião [town]
 Felgueiras [city]
 Gondomar [city]
 Lousada [town]
 Maia [city]
 Marco de Canaveses  [city]
 Matosinhos  [city]
 Paços de Ferreira [city]
 Paredes  [city]
 Penafiel  [city]
 Porto  [main city]
 Póvoa de Varzim  [city]
 Santo Tirso  [city]
 Trofa  [city]
 Valongo  [city]
 Vila do Conde  [city]
 Vila Nova de Gaia [city], the most populous municipality and the only municipality in Porto District located south of the Douro River.

All of the above Municipalities are Cities, except Baião and Lousada.
Some municipalities include one or more cities;the municipality of Paredes has the most cities  within its municipality: Paredes, Gandra, Rebordosa and São Salvador de Lordelo.
Other cities in Porto district: Rio Tinto and Valbom (in Gondomar municipality), Ermesinde (in Valongo municipality),
São Mamede de Infesta (in Matosinhos municipality),
Freamunde (in Paços de Ferreira municipality) and
Lixa (in Felgueiras municipality).

Main Airport
Porto Airport /Oporto Int.(OPO) Sá Carneiro, mostly located in Pedras Rubras, Moreira, Maia, Grande Porto.

Main Harbour
Leixões in Matosinhos, Porto area.

Summary of votes and seats won 1976–2022

|- class="unsortable"
!rowspan=2|Parties!!%!!S!!%!!S!!%!!S!!%!!S!!%!!S!!%!!S!!%!!S!!%!!S!!%!!S!!%!!S!!%!!S!!%!!S!!%!!S!!%!!S!!%!!S!!%!!S
|- class="unsortable" align="center"
!colspan=2 | 1976
!colspan=2 | 1979
!colspan=2 | 1980
!colspan=2 | 1983
!colspan=2 | 1985
!colspan=2 | 1987
!colspan=2 | 1991
!colspan=2 | 1995
!colspan=2 | 1999
!colspan=2 | 2002
!colspan=2 | 2005
!colspan=2 | 2009
!colspan=2 | 2011
!colspan=2 | 2015
!colspan=2 | 2019
!colspan=2 | 2022
|-
| align="left"| PS || style="background:#FF66FF;"|40.7 || style="background:#FF66FF;"|18 || 34.8 || 14 || 34.3 || 14 || style="background:#FF66FF;"|43.0 || style="background:#FF66FF;"|18 || 23.6 || 10 || 26.7 || 11 || 32.9 || 13 || style="background:#FF66FF;"|46.7 || style="background:#FF66FF;"|18  || style="background:#FF66FF;"|48.0 || style="background:#FF66FF;"|19 || style="background:#FF66FF;"|41.2 || style="background:#FF66FF;"|17 || style="background:#FF66FF;"|48.5 || style="background:#FF66FF;"|20 || style="background:#FF66FF;"|41.8 || style="background:#FF66FF;"|18 || 32.0 || 14 || 32.7 || 14 || style="background:#FF66FF;"|36.7 || style="background:#FF66FF;"|17 || style="background:#FF66FF;"|42.5 || style="background:#FF66FF;"|19
|-
| align="left"| PSD || 27.0 || 11 || align=center colspan=4 rowspan=2|In AD || 26.2 || 10 || style="background:#FF9900;"|29.3 || style="background:#FF9900;"|12 || style="background:#FF9900;"|50.9 || style="background:#FF9900;"|22 || style="background:#FF9900;"|51.3 || style="background:#FF9900;"|21 || 36.4 || 14 || 32.7 || 13 || 40.0 || 16 || 27.8 || 12 || 29.2 || 12 || style="background:#FF9900;"|39.2 || style="background:#FF9900;"|17 || align=center colspan=2 rowspan=2|In PàF || 31.2 || 15 || 32.3 || 14
|-
| align="left"| CDS-PP || 15.7 || 6 || 12.5 || 5 || 9.8 || 4 || 4.0 || 1 || 4.1 || 1 || 7.8 || 3 || 7.5 || 3 || 8.4 || 3 || 6.9 || 2 || 9.3 || 4 || 10.0 || 4 || 3.3 || 1 || 1.5
|-
| align="left"| PCP/APU/CDU || 8.4 || 3 || 14.5 || 6 || 11.9 || 5 || 13.6 || 5 || 12.1 || 5 || 9.4 || 4 || 6.4 || 2 || 6.0 || 2 || 6.2 || 2 || 4.6 || 1 || 5.4 || 2 || 5.7 || 2 || 6.2 || 2 || 6.8 || 3 || 4.8 || 2 || 3.3 || 1
|-
| align="left"| AD || colspan=2| || style="background:#00FFFF;"|44.5 || style="background:#00FFFF;"|18 || style="background:#00FFFF;"|46.6 || style="background:#00FFFF;"|19 || colspan=26| 
|-
| align="left"| PRD || colspan=8| || 20.5 || 8 || 4.0 || 1 || colspan=20|
|-
| align="left"| BE || colspan=16| || 2.3 ||  || 2.7 || 1 || 6.7 || 2 || 9.2 || 3 || 5.1 || 2 || 11.1 || 5 || 10.1 || 4 || 4.8 || 2
|-
| align="left"| PàF || colspan=26| || style="background:#00AAAA;"|39.6 || style="background:#00AAAA;"|17 || colspan=4|
|-
| align="left"| PAN || colspan=28| || 3.5 || 1 || 1.7
|-
| align="left"| IL || colspan=28| || 1.5 ||  || 5.1 || 2
|-
| align="left"| CHEGA || colspan=28| || 0.6 ||  || 4.4 || 2
|-
! Total seats || colspan=8| 38 || colspan=4|39 || colspan=6|37 || colspan=4|38 || colspan=6|39 || colspan=4|40
|-
! colspan=33|Source: Comissão Nacional de Eleições
|}

References